, often shortened to Astral Buddy, is a Japanese manga series written by Kazuma Kamachi and illustrated by Yasuhito Nogi, which was serialized by ASCII Media Works through their monthly magazine Dengeki Daioh from April 2017 to July 2020. The manga is a spin-off of A Certain Scientific Railgun series, focusing on a Tokiwadai Middle School student named Junko Hokaze and her encounter with the "ghost" named Senya Yūri. Seven Seas Entertainment publishes the manga in English.

Premise

Junko Hokaze, the second-in-command of Misaki Shokuhō's clique known for her lavender ringlet hair, is being stalked by a "ghost" girl and begins to investigate her presence. The event takes place in conjunction with the Dream Ranker story arc of A Certain Scientific Railgun series.

Media

Manga
A spin-off of A Certain Scientific Railgun was announced in the May issue of Dengeki Daioh on March 27, 2017, which began serialization in its next issue on April 27. Ogino Kentarō, the manga editor, announced that the spin-off's first release coincided with the 10th anniversary of its parent manga. The manga is written by Kazuma Kamachi and illustrated by Yasuhito Nogi, with characters designed by Kiyotaka Haimura. Astral Buddy concluded upon the magazine's release of the September 2020 issue on July 27, 2020. The manga was collected into four tankōbon volumes. Seven Seas Entertainment announced the acquisition of the manga's license at Anime Expo 2018 in Los Angeles, California.

Reception

Sales
Astral Buddy ranked 49th on Oricon's top weekly manga between November 27 and December 3, 2017, with 16,711 estimated total copies of the first volume sold. The spin-off took 64th place on Amazon's weekly manga ranking dated October 26–November 1, 2020.

Critical response
Robert McCarthy of Otaku USA reviewed the first volume of Astral Buddy, lauding the plot of the manga but describing the panels and pages of it as a mess because some parts of them were hard to tell what it wanted to convey. He criticized the cluttered speed lines and the visual presentation of espers' powers. The continuous use of panty flashing and the "romance" between female characters led him to consider the manga as a fan service.

Notes

References

External links
A Certain Scientific Railgun: Astral Buddy at Dengeki Daioh 

A Certain Magical Index
ASCII Media Works manga
Dengeki Daioh
Science fiction anime and manga
Seven Seas Entertainment titles
Shōnen manga
Supernatural anime and manga